Sittin' Here Thinkin', also released as Sad and Lonesome, is an album by blues musician John Lee Hooker recorded in 1961 and released by the Muse label in 1979.

Reception

AllMusic reviewer Tom Schulte stated: "John Lee Hooker is a master of the primal, hypnotic Delta blues. Accompanied by nothing other than a bare beat of the drums (if not only the stomp of his own feet), "The Healer" can mesmerize. The simple, but effective, tools of his trade are one-chord songs and a ton of downbeat emotion".

Track listing
All compositions credited to John Lee Hooker
 "I Bought You a Brand New Home" – 3:27
 "I Believe I'll Lose My Mind" – 3:46
 "Teasin' Me" – 3:35
 "My Cryin' Days Are Over" – 3:20
 "Sittin' Here Thinkin'" – 3:21
 "Mean Mistreatin'" – 4:10
 "How Long?" – 3:20
 "How Many More Years?" – 3:33
 "C.C. Rider" (Traditional) – 3:39
 "Sad and Lonesome" – 4:36
 "Can't You See What You're Doin' to Me?" – 4:45
 "When My Wife Quit Me" – 3:41

Personnel
John Lee Hooker – lead guitar, vocals
Unidentified musicians – guitar, bass, drums

References

John Lee Hooker albums
1979 albums
Muse Records albums